Crenella is a genus of bean mussels in the family Mytilidae.

Species
Species in the genus Crenella include:
 Crenella abbotti Altena, 1968
 Crenella adamsiana
 Crenella arenaria Martin Monterosato, 1875
 Crenella canariensis (Odhner, 1932)
 Crenella caudiva Olsson, 1961
 Crenella decussata (Montagu, 1808)
 Crenella divaricata (Orbigny in Sagra, 1853)
 Crenella ehrenbergi
 Crenella faba (O. F. Müller, 1776) - little bean mussel
 Crenella gemma Olsson & McGinty, 1958
 Crenella glandula (Totten, 1834) - glandular bean mussel
 Crenella magellanica Linse, 2002
 Crenella marionensis E. A. Smith, 1885
 Crenella minuta Thiele & Jaeckel, 1931
 Crenella pectinula (Gould, 1841)
 Crenella pellucida (Jeffreys, 1859)
 Crenella pura E. A. Smith, 1890
 Crenella skomma (McLean & Schwengel, 1944)

 Fossil species
 †Crenella anterodivaricata Eames, 1951
 †Crenella cucullata Deshayes, 1861
 †Crenella cymbiola Vincent, 1930
 †Crenella depontaillieri Cossmann & Lambert, 1884
 †Crenella elegans Deshayes, 1861
 †Crenella humilis Vincent, 1930
 †Crenella scrobiculata von Koenen, 1883
 †Crenella striatina Deshayes, 1861
 †Crenella striatocostata Nagao, 1928

References

Mytilidae
Bivalve genera